Protostropharia semiglobata, commonly known as the dung roundhead, the halfglobe mushroom, or the hemispheric stropharia, is an agaric fungus of the family Strophariaceae. A common and widespread species with a cosmopolitan distribution, the fungus produces mushrooms on the dung of various wild and domesticated herbivores.

Taxonomy
The species was first described as Agaricus semiglobatus by August Batsch in 1786. It has had a complicated taxonomic history, having been shuffled to many different genera. In addition to Agaricus the species has been placed in Coprinus, Geophila, Psalliota, and Psilocybe.  French mycologist Lucien Quélet gave it its most commonly used name in 1872 when he transferred it to Stropharia. In 2013, Scott Redhead made it the type species of Protostropharia, a new genus circumscribed to contain  Stropharia species characterized by the formation of astrocystidia rather than acanthocytes on their mycelium. A form sterilis and two varieties, minor and radicata, described by F.H. Møller in 1945, are no longer considered to have independent taxonomic significance.

The specific epithet semiglobata is Latin for "half-spherical", and refers to the shape of the cap. It is commonly known as the halfglobe mushroom, the hemispheric stropharia, the round stropharia, or the dung roundhead.

Description

The cap surface is smooth and sticky, and initially has a light yellow color that fades in maturity to dull yellow or whitish. The gills have an adnate attachment to the stem with a slight decurrent tooth. They are distantly spaced and broad–about 6–8 mm; mature gills become ventricose (swollen). The gills are initially grayish, but become purplish brown to dark purple as the spores mature. The edges of the gills are white and fringed. Initially filled with a cottony pith, the stem becomes hollow in maturity. A delicate ring forms an annular zone on the mid to upper portion of the stem that may be darkened from spore deposits. Above the annular zone, the stem is covered with fine silk-like hairs; below, it is sticky. The stem tissue is white with a yellowish pith. The flesh has no distinctive odor, and a taste that is mild to slightly bitter. The fruit bodies have been listed as edible by some authors, but poisonous by others;  even when not toxic, mushrooms that grow on dung are usually considered unpalatable, though the common mushroom is an obvious counter-example.

The mushroom produce a dark purple spore print. The thick-walled spores are ellipsoidal, smooth, and have a small apical germ pore; they measure 16.1–19.0 by 8.8–11.0 μm. The basidia (spore-bearing cells) are four-spored, club-shaped, hyaline (translucent), and measure 33–40 by 13–14.6 μm.

Similar species
Other mushrooms that resemble Protostropharia semiglobosa include Stropharia dorsispora, S. luteonitens, and Panaeolus semiovatus.

Habitat and distribution
A saprobic species, the fungus fruits in small groups on dung, in soil containing manure, on lawns, grasslands, or in livestock corrals. It has been recorded on the dung of a variety of wild and domesticated herbivores and ungulates, including rabbit, sheep, cow, buffalo, moose, bear, and wallaby. In some instances, the dung substrate is under moss so that it appears as if the mushroom is growing from the moss. Fruits bodies sometimes occur with another dung-loving fungus, Deconica coprophila. A widespread and common species, P. semiglobosa has a cosmopolitan distribution, having been recorded from northern Asia, Australia, Europe, Central and South America, North America, North Africa, and New Zealand.  It is thought to have been introduced to Australia with imported domestic stock.

References

External links

Strophariaceae
Fungi of Africa
Fungi of Asia
Fungi of Australia
Fungi of Central America
Fungi of Europe
Fungi of New Zealand
Fungi of North America
Fungi of South America
Fungi described in 1786
Taxa named by August Batsch